Ugly Buildings, Whores, and Politicians: Greatest Hits 1998–2009 is a compilation album released by New West Records of songs coming from the first seven albums of the Drive-By Truckers discography.  It was produced by David Barbe and "leads fans on an abbreviated journey of what the band has accomplished in their first 11 years." The album was released on compact disc and vinyl formats.

Track listing

Personnel
Patterson Hood – guitar, vocals
Mike Cooley – guitar, vocals
Jason Isbell – guitar, vocals
Brad Morgan – drums, vocals
Shonna Tucker – bass, vocals
John Neff – guitar, pedal steel
Rob Malone – lyrics, vocals, guitar
Earl Hicks – bass
Matt Lane – drums

Charts

References

2011 greatest hits albums
Drive-By Truckers albums